Round Lake is a lake in the city of Eden Prairie, Hennepin County, Minnesota.  There is a park called Round Lake Park near the lake that holds various gatherings such as a Fourth of July Celebration and other city-sponsored events.

It is called round lake because of its near-perfect circular shape.

Lakes of Minnesota
Eden Prairie, Minnesota
Lakes of Hennepin County, Minnesota